A Sentimental Journey Through France and Italy is a novel by Laurence Sterne, written and first published in 1768, as Sterne was facing death. In 1765, Sterne travelled through France and Italy as far south as Naples, and after returning determined to describe his travels from a sentimental point of view. The novel can be seen as an epilogue to the possibly unfinished work The Life and Opinions of Tristram Shandy, Gentleman, and also as an answer to Tobias Smollett's decidedly unsentimental Travels Through France and Italy. Sterne had met Smollett during his travels in Europe, and strongly objected to his spleen, acerbity and quarrelsomeness. He modelled the character of Smelfungus on him.

The novel was extremely popular and influential and helped establish travel writing as the dominant genre of the second half of the 18th century. Unlike prior travel accounts which stressed classical learning and objective non-personal points of view, A Sentimental Journey emphasized the subjective discussions of personal taste and sentiments, of manners and morals over classical learning. Throughout the 1770s female travel writers began publishing significant numbers of sentimental travel accounts. Sentiment also became a favourite style among those expressing non-mainstream views, including political radicalism.

The narrator is the Reverend Mr. Yorick, who is slyly represented to guileless readers as Sterne's barely disguised alter ego. The book recounts his various adventures, usually of the amorous type, in a series of self-contained episodes. The book is less eccentric and more elegant in style than Tristram Shandy and was better received by contemporary critics. It was published on 27 February, and on 18 March Sterne died.

Plot summary

Yorick's journey starts in Calais, where he meets a monk who begs for donations to his convent. Yorick initially refuses to give him anything, but later regrets his decision. He and the monk exchange their snuff-boxes. He buys a chaise to continue his journey. The next town he visits is Montreuil, where he hires a servant to accompany him on his journey, a young man named La Fleur.

During his stay in Paris, Yorick is informed that the police inquired for his passport at his hotel. Without a passport at a time when England is at war with France (Sterne travelled to Paris in January 1762, before the Seven Years' War ended), he risks imprisonment in the Bastille. Yorick decides to travel to Versailles, where he visits the Count de B**** to acquire a passport. When Yorick notices the count reads Hamlet, he points with his finger at Yorick's name, mentioning that he is Yorick. The count mistakes him for the king's jester and quickly procures him a passport. Yorick fails in his attempt to correct the count, and remains satisfied with receiving his passport so quickly.

Yorick returns to Paris, and continues his voyage to Italy after staying in Paris for a few more days. Along the way he decides to visit Maria—who was introduced in Sterne's previous novel, Tristram Shandy—in Moulins. Maria's mother tells Yorick that Maria has been struck with grief since her husband died. Yorick consoles Maria, and then leaves.

After having passed Lyon during his journey, Yorick spends the night in a roadside inn. Because there is only one bedroom, he is forced to share the room with a lady and her chamber-maid ("fille de chambre"). When Yorick can't sleep and accidentally breaks his promise to remain silent during the night, an altercation with the lady ensues. During the confusion, Yorick accidentally grabs hold of something belonging to the chamber-maid. The last line is: "when I stretch'd out my hand I caught hold of the fille de chambre's... End of vol II". The sentence is open to interpretation. You can say the last word is omitted, or that he stretched out his hand, and caught hers (this would be grammatically correct). Another interpretation is to incorporate "End of Vol. II" into the sentence, so that he grabs the Fille de Chambre's 'End'.

Sequel
Because Sterne died before he could finish the novel, his long-time friend John Hall-Stevenson (identified with Eugenius in the novel) wrote a continuation. It is titled Yorick's Sentimental Journey Continued: To Which Is Prefixed Some Account of the Life and Writings of Mr. Sterne.

Legacy
In the 1880s, American writer Elizabeth Robins Pennell and her artist husband Joseph Pennell undertook a journey following Sterne's route. Their travels by tandem bicycle were turned into the book Our sentimental journey through France and Italy (1888).

Viktor Shklovsky considered Sterne one of his most important precursors as a writer, and his own A Sentimental Journey: Memoirs, 1917–1922 was indebted to both Sterne's own Sentimental Journey and Tristram Shandy.

Footnotes

External links

 A Sentimental Journey Through France and Italy, Literature in Context: An Open Anthology of Literature. 2021. Web.
 A Sentimental Journey Through France and Italy at Project Gutenberg
 A Sentimental Journey Through France and Italy public domain audiobook at LibriVox
 Editions of A Sentimental Journey held by the Laurence Sterne Trust
 Images from an 1875 French edition extra-illustrated with watercolors in the margins by Louis Émile Benassit

1768 novels
18th-century British novels
Sentimental novels
Novels by Laurence Sterne
Unfinished novels
Novels set in France
Autobiographical novels
Self-reflexive novels
Travel novels